Devotion is the sixth Korean-language studio album by South Korean girl group Baby V.O.X. It was released on April 3, 2003, by DR Music and Doremi Media (now Genie Music). The group topped the Chinese music chart with the Chinese single "I'm Still Loving You", and placed 3rd with "What Should I Do" which also peaked at number 4 in Thailand. The album sold about 610,000 copies in Asia.

Track listing 
 나 어떡해
 바램
 슬픈 기대
 상처
 사랑인가봐요
 나를 잡아줘
 Loveless
 눈물 
 거짓사랑 
 버려진 이별
 마지막엔
 A.S.A.P (As Soon As Possible)
 우연 (Deep club remix)
 I'm Still Loving You

Members during this release 
Kim E-Z

Shim Eun-Jin

Kan Mi-Youn

Yoon Eun-Hye

Lee Hee-Jin

DR Music albums
Genie Music albums
2003 albums
Baby V.O.X. albums